Stenella aucklandica is a species of anamorphic fungi.

References

External links

aucklandica
Fungi described in 2003